Pittosporum fairchildii, commonly called Fairchild's kohuhu, is a species of plant in the Pittosporaceae family. It is endemic to New Zealand. This species was first described by Thomas Frederic Cheeseman. It is named in honour of Captain J. Fairchild, a 19th-century seaman who commanded the S.S. Stella.

References

fairchildii
Endemic flora of New Zealand
Taxonomy articles created by Polbot
Taxa named by Thomas Frederic Cheeseman